The Anchor Bible Series, which consists of a commentary series, a Bible dictionary, and a reference library, is a scholarly and commercial co-venture which was begun in 1956, with the publication of individual volumes in the commentary series. Over 1,000 scholars—representing Jewish, Catholic, Eastern Orthodox, Protestant, Muslim, secular, and other traditions—have contributed to the project. Their works offer discussions that reflect a range of viewpoints across a wide theological spectrum. 

As of 2008, more than 120 volumes had been published, initially under oversight of the series' founding General Editor David Noel Freedman (1956–2008), and subsequently under John J. Collins (2008–Present). Each volume was originally published by Doubleday (a division of Random House, Inc.), but in 2007, the series was acquired by Yale University Press. Yale now prints all new volumes as the Anchor Yale Bible Series, while continuing to offer all previously published Anchor Bible titles as well.

Anchor Bible Commentary Series
The Anchor Bible Commentary Series, created under the guidance of William Foxwell Albright (1891–1971), comprises a translation and exegesis of the Hebrew Bible, the New Testament and the Intertestamental Books (the Catholic and Eastern Orthodox Deuterocanon/the Protestant Apocrypha; not the books called by Catholics and Orthodox "Apocrypha", which are widely called by Protestants "Pseudepigrapha"). For each biblical book, the series includes an original translation with translational and text-critical notes; overviews of the historical, critical, and literary evolution of the text; an outline of major themes and topics; a verse-by-verse commentary; treatment of competing scholarly theories; historical background; and photographs, illustrations, and maps of artifacts and places associated with biblical figures and sites. Depending on the size and complexity of the book, some are covered in more than one volume.

The series has produced over 100 titles since the release of the first volume in the early 1960's. Despite boasting at least one volume on every book of the Hebrew Bible, New Testament, and Deuterocanon/Apocrypha, the series remains a work in progress. Revisions and replacements of earlier works continue to be released, and at least a half-dozen volumes are currently under contract or in production.

Anchor Bible Dictionary

The Anchor Bible Dictionary contains more than 6,000 entries from 800 international scholars. It has illustrations and line-art throughout, and is also available for download from Logos Bible Software or Accordance Bible Software. The "Dictionary" includes articles on the Dead Sea Scrolls, early Jewish-Christian relations, the historical Jesus, sociological and literary methods of biblical criticism, feminist hermeneutics, and numerous entries on archaeological sites, as well as bibliographies with citations listed individually at the end of each article.

Anchor Bible Reference Library

The Anchor Bible Reference Library is an open-ended series composed of more than thirty separate volumes with information about anthropology, archaeology, ecology, geography, history, languages, literature, philosophy, religions, and theology, among others.

Works in the Anchor Yale Bible Commentary series

As of 2021, the Anchor Yale Bible Commentary series include the following volumes (NB: the volumes are arranged by their assigned series number, which differs at points from the standard canonical orders):

Hebrew Bible / Old Testament

  454 pages.
 In production:  (2 volumes expected)
  656 pages.
  865 pages.
 In production:  (2 volumes expected)
  1085 pages.
  656 pages.
  720 pages.
  544 pages.
  624 pages.
  480 pages.
 In production:  (2 volumes expected)
  608 pages.
  376 pages.
  600 pages.
 In production: 
  592 pages.
 In production: 
  216 pages.
  175 pages.
 Replaced:  168 pages.
  192 pages.
  768 pages.
  240 pages.
  504 pages.
  576 pages.
  576 pages.
  408 pages.
  544 pages.
  Replaced:  336 pages.
  608 pages.
  312 pages.
  360 pages.
 In production:  504 pages.
  507 pages.
  384 pages.
  432 pages.
  544 pages.
 257 pages.
  720 pages.
  704 pages.
  448 pages.
  544 pages.
  432 pages.
  368 pages.
  304 pages.
  524 pages.
  960 pages.
  672 pages.
  656 pages.
  416 pages.
  372 pages.
  368  pages.
  360 pages.
  720 pages.
  1024 pages.
  384 pages.
  272 pages.
  336 pages.
  720 pages.
  464 pages.
  312 pages.
 In production: 
 In production:  288 pages.
  416 pages.
  192 pages.
  576 pages.
  864 pages.
  480 pages.

New Testament

  576 pages.
  592 pages.
  Replaced:  744 pages.
  672 pages.
  864 pages.
  848 pages.
  544 pages.
  688 pages.
  840 pages.
  824 pages.
  Replaced:  468 pages.
  688 pages.
  Replaced:  408 pages.
  648 pages.
  640 pages.
  832 pages.
  608 pages.
  832 pages.
  464 pages.
  849 pages.
  552 pages.
  138 pages.
  384 pages.
  512 pages.
  640 pages.
  Replaced:  312 pages.
  264 pages.
  608 pages.
  1200 pages.
  300 pages.
  528 pages.
  928 pages.

Apocrypha / Deuterocanon 
  624 pages.
  288 pages.
  368 pages.
  592 pages.
  592 pages.
  496 pages.
  352 pages.
  360 pages.
  384 pages.
  278 pages.

Works in the Anchor Yale Bible Reference Library
Works in the Anchor Yale Bible Reference Library include:

 
 
 
 
 
 
 
 
 
 
 
 
 
 
 
 
 
 
 
 
 
 
 
 
  - (in preparation)
 
 
 
 
 
 
 
 
 
 
 
 
 
 
 
  - (in preparation)

See also
 List of Biblical commentaries

References

External links
 Yale University Press: The Anchor Yale Bible Series (publisher's page)
 New York Times article on the Series

Biblical commentaries
Series of non-fiction books